Nano Ripe (styled as nano.RIPE) is a Japanese pop rock duo that formed in 1998 as an indie band. They released three singles and four mini-albums before being signed to Lantis in 2010. Although the core of the band is made up of Kimiko (composition, lyrics, vocals, guitar) and Jun Sasaki (composition, guitar), when they debuted on Lantis in 2010, the band also consisted of bassist Nobuyuki Abe and drummer Shinn. Shinn left the band in 2011, but Yūki Aoyama joined the band as the drummer in 2013. Abe and Aoyama left the band in 2016.

Following the release of their major debut single "Patricia" (2010), they released four more singles from 2010 to 2011; all five were featured on their major debut album Hoshi no Yoru no Myaku no Oto no (2011). Their next three studio albums were Plus to Minus no Shikumi (2012), Namida no Ochiru Sokudo (2013), and Nanairo Megane no Himitsu (2014). After the release of their compilation album Shiawase no Kutsu (2015), they released their fifth studio album Space Echo (2016) and their sixth studio album Pippala no Ki no Shita de (2018). This was followed by their second compilation album Tsuki ni Sumu Hoshi no Uta: Nano Ripe 10th Anniversary Best (2020) and their seventh studio album Fuminshō no Neko to Yoru (2022).

Members
 (composition, lyrics, vocals, guitar)
 (composition, guitar)

Past members
Shinn (drums)
 (bass)
 (drums)

History

1998–2014
Nano Ripe formed in 1998 with Kimiko and Jun Sasaki as an indie band. They released their first two singles independently:  on October 31, 2004 and "Tricycle Rider" in April 2006. Their first two mini-albums were also released independently:  on March 12, 2007 and 88 on March 7, 2008. Their next single  was also released by White Dream on November 25, 2009. By January 2010, bassist Nobuyuki Abe had joined the band.

Nano Ripe was signed to Lantis in 2010, and released their major debut single  on September 22, 2010. They released their second single  on December 22, 2010. Their third single  was released on April 20, 2011; the title song was used as the opening theme of the anime series Hanasaku Iroha. They released their fourth single  on June 29, 2011. Their fifth single  followed on August 3, 2011 and the title song is used as the second opening theme of Hanasaku Iroha. Their major debut album  was released on October 19, 2011. The drummer Shinn left the band on November 12, 2011.

Nano Ripe released their sixth single  on January 31, 2012 limited to 1,000 copies. Nano Ripe released  as their seventh single on April 25, 2012; the title song is used as the opening theme of the anime series Sankarea. The band's eighth single  was released on July 25, 2012; the title song is used as the opening theme of the anime series Humanity Has Declined. Nano Ripe's second studio album  was released on October 3, 2012. Their ninth single  was released on October 31, 2012; the title song is used as the opening theme of the third season of the anime series Bakuman. Yūki Aoyama became a support drummer for the band in February 2013 and officially joined the band the following month.

Nano Ripe's tenth single  was released on March 6, 2013; the song is used as the theme song to the 2013 anime film Hanasaku Iroha: Home Sweet Home. Nano Ripe's 11th single  was released on May 22, 2013; the three songs from the single are used as ending themes of the 2013 anime series The Devil Is a Part-Timer!. The band's 12th single  was released on October 30, 2013; the song is used as the opening theme to the 2013 anime series Non Non Biyori. Nano Ripe's third studio album  was released on January 8, 2014. Nano Ripe's 13th single  was released on July 23, 2014; the song is used as the ending theme to the 2014 anime series Glasslip.

2015–present
Nano Ripe's fourth studio album  was released on April 8, 2015. Included on the album is a cover of Spitz's song . Nano Ripe's 14th single  was released on July 22, 2015; the song is used as the opening theme to the 2015 anime series Non Non Biyori Repeat. Nano Ripe released their first compilation album  on September 23, 2015. Nano Ripe's 15th single  was released on February 24, 2016; the song is used as the ending theme to the 2016 anime series Undefeated Bahamut Chronicle. Nano Ripe made their North American debut at Anime Boston in March 2016. The band's 16th single  was released on August 3, 2016; the song is used as the ending theme to the 2016 anime series Food Wars! Shokugeki no Soma: The Second Plate. Nano Ripe's fifth studio album  was released on October 19, 2016. The bassist Nobuyuki Abe and drummer Yūki Aoyama left the band in late 2016. Aoyama later died in August 2018.

Nano Ripe's 17th single  was released on April 29, 2017 and was only available during events on Nano Ripe's 2017 tour . The band's 18th single  was released on November 15, 2017; the song is used as the ending theme to the 2017 anime series Food Wars! Shokugeki no Soma: The Third Plate. Nano Ripe's 19th single  was released on February 7, 2018; the song is used as the opening theme to the 2018 anime series Citrus. Nano Ripe's song  is used as the opening theme song to the 2018 anime film Non Non Biyori Vacation. Nano Ripe's sixth studio album  was released on August 29, 2018. The digital single  was released on May 3, 2019, followed by the band's 20th single  on August 21, 2019. Their 21st single  was released on November 6, 2019; the song is used as the ending theme to the 2019 anime series Food Wars! Shokugeki no Soma: The Fourth Plate.

Nano Ripe's 22nd single  was released on April 22, 2020; the song is used as the opening theme to the 2020 anime series Food Wars! Shokugeki no Soma: The Fifth Plate. They released their second compilation album  on September 23, 2020. Nano Ripe's song  was released on the Non Non Biyori theme song compilation album  on February 24, 2021; the song is used as the opening theme to the 2021 anime series Non Non Biyori Nonstop. Their digital mini album  was released on November 5, 2021. Nano Ripe's seventh studio album  was released on October 12, 2022.

Discography

Albums

Studio albums

Compilation albums

Singles

Music videos

Other album appearances

Additional songs

References

External links
 

Anime musical groups
Japanese pop music groups
Japanese pop rock music groups
Lantis (company) artists
Musical groups established in 1998
Musical groups from Tokyo
Japanese musical duos